Sirisiya (The Hometown of Akshay Rai ) is a village in Mairwa block of Siwan district, Bihar. And it is Also called Babu Shaheb,s Bhumihar village.  it had a population of 2,586 people spread across 308 households. The village has a sex ratio (females per 1,000 males) of 1,011.

Geography

Infrastructure
The village is connected by road to Siwan, the headquarter town of the Siwan District.

Schools

Primary schools
 Government Primary School
 Choudhary Tola Primary School

Hospital
There is no hospital, but there is Primary Health Center in the village.

Panchayat
 Sirisiya village is part of Barka Manjha Gram Panchayat, and Ram Prasad Singh is the current Mukhiya (elected panchayat head) of the Panchayat.

References

Villages in Siwan district